Ro(c)k podvraťáků is a Czech comedy film directed by Karel Janák. It was released in 2006.

Cast and characters
 Vojtěch Kotek as Luki
 Jiří Mádl as Márty
 Martin Písařík as Radek
 Michael Beran as Tom
 Klára Jandová as Aneta Sallingerová
 Ema Jurková as Tereza
 Kristýna Nováková as Šárka
 Václav Postránecký as Boss Sallinger
 Pavel Rímský as Igor
 Predrag Bjelac as Chřestýš
 Jan Hrušínský as starosta
 Petr Janda as Django
 Václav Sloup as Radkův děda
 Liliyan Malkina as Radkova babička

See also
Ro(c)k Podvraťáků (video game)

References

External links
 

2006 films
2006 comedy films
Czech comedy films
2000s Czech-language films
2000s Czech films
Czech teen films